The family name Regan, along with its cognates O'Regan, O Regan, Reagan, and O'Reagan, is an Anglicized form of the Irish surname Ó Riagáin or Ó Ríogáin, from Ua Riagáin. The meaning is likely to have originated in ancient Gaelic ri "sovereign, king" and the diminutive suffix -in; thus "the king's child" or "big king". The name was borne by two distinct families: one seated in Meath, the other in Thomond.

The O'Regans of Meath were a branch of the southern Ui Neill and one of the four Tribes of Tara. Before the Anglo-Norman invasion, they were lords of south Breagh and the north of present-day County Dublin. They took a leading part in the wars against the Danes. In the year 1029, Mathghamhain Ó Riagáin, king of Breagh, captured the king of Dublin, Amhlaoibh son of Sitric, releasing him only upon payment of an enormous ransom, which included the celebrated Sword of Carlus. The O'Regans were dispossessed soon after the invasion and dispersed through Ireland.

The O'Regans of Thomond are a Dalcassian family said to be descended from Riagán, son of Donncuan, brother of Brian Boru, and now numerous throughout Ireland.

The unisex forename Regan is likely to have derived sometime later from the Latin Regina "queen", the feminine form of Rex (stem reg-) "king", which is also the source of the name Reginald.

Persons with the surname
 Ash Regan (born 1974), Scottish politician
 Bill Regan (disambiguation)
 Bob Regan (born 1947), American country music songwriter
 Brian Regan (disambiguation), several people
 Bridget Regan (born 1982), American actress
 Charles Tate Regan (1878–1943), British ichthyologist
 Daithí Regan (born 1968), Irish hurler
 David M. Regan (born 1935), Canadian psychologist
 Donald Regan (1918–2003), U.S. Treasury Secretary and Chief of Staff to President Ronald Reagan
 Edward Regan (1930–2014), American politician and government bureaucrat
 Eugene Regan (born 1952), Irish barrister and politician
 Fionn Regan (born 1981), Irish folk musician
 Frank S. Regan (1862–1944), American politician and businessman
 Geoff Regan (born 1959), Canadian politician and federal cabinet minister, son of Gerald Regan
 Gerald Regan (1928–2019), 19th premier of Nova Scotia, father of Geoff, Laura and Nancy Regan
 Jack Regan (1912–1988), Australian rules footballer
 James Regan (disambiguation)
 Jayne Regan (1909–2000), American actress
 Jessica Regan (born 1982), Irish actress
 Joan Regan (1928–2013), English singer
 John Regan (disambiguation)
 Judith Regan (born 1953), book publisher
 Julianne Regan (born 1962), English singer, songwriter and musician, lead singer of the band All About Eve
 Kelly Regan (born 1961), Canadian politician, wife of Geoff Regan
 Kenneth M. Regan (1891–1959), American politician
 Larry Regan (1930–2009), Canadian National Hockey League player, coach, manager and executive
 Laura Regan (born 1977), Canadian actress, daughter of Gerald Regan
 Linda Regan (born 1949), English actress who appeared in the British TV show Hi-de-Hi!
 Mark Regan (born 1972), English rugby union player
 Mike Regan (disambiguation)
 Nancy Regan (born 1966), Canadian news anchor, journalist and TV personality, daughter of Gerald Regan
 Patrick Regan (disambiguation)
 Phil Regan (actor) (1906–1996)
 Phil Regan (baseball) (born 1937), American Major League Baseball pitcher
 Robert P. Regan (1936–1995), American businessman and politician
Seamus O'Regan (born 1971), Canadian politician and former television personality
 Terry Regan (born 1958), Australian former rugby league footballer
 Tim O'Regan, American musician
 Tom Regan (1938–2017), American philosopher, animal rights activist and academic
 Tony Óg Regan (born 1983), Irish hurler
 Trish Regan (born 1972), American broadcast journalist and author
 Vincent Regan (born 1965), British actor

Persons with the given name
 Regan Hagar, American rock drummer
 Regan Harrison (born 1977), Australian retired swimmer
 Regan Hartley (born 1990), Miss New Hampshire for 2011
 Regan King (born 1980), New Zealand rugby union footballer
 Regan Lamble (born 1991), Australian racewalker
 Regan Lauscher (born 1980), Canadian luger
 Regan Mizrahi (born 2000), American child actor
 Regan Poole (born 1998), Welsh footballer
 Regan Russell (1955–2020), Canadian animal rights activist
 Regan Smith (born 1983), American stock car racing driver
 Regan Upshaw (born 1975), American retired National Football League player[
 Regan Bunnell (born in 2009), Canada Ontario news in 2020

Fictional characters
 Regan (King Lear), a daughter of King Lear in Shakespeare's play King Lear
 Regan MacNeil, the central character of the novel The Exorcist
 Regan O'Neill, the narrator and viewpoint character of the novel Luna by Julie Anne Peters
 Regan Wyngarde, also known as Lady Mastermind, a Marvel Comics villain
 Jack Regan (The Sweeney), protagonist of the British television police drama The Sweeney
 Regan Hamleigh, character in The Pillars of the Earth novel and miniseries
 Rory Regan in the DC Comics Universe
 Charlotte Sternwood Regan The Big Sleep
 Regan Abbott, character in the movie A Quiet Place

See also
 Reagan (disambiguation)

References

Surnames of Irish origin
Surnames of Scottish origin
English-language surnames
Surnames from given names